Hargovind Laxmishanker "H. L." Trivedi (31 August 1932 – 2 October 2019) was an Indian nephrologist, immunologist, transplant surgeon and stem cell researcher.

He was a pioneer of transplantation medicine in India and a founding director of the Kidney Hospital in Ahmedabad. He and his team performed more than 5200 kidney transplantations. He was awarded the Padma Shri in 2015.

Early life 
Trivedi was born on 31 August 1932 in the village of Charadva near Halvad (now in Morbi district, Gujarat). His father Laxmishankar Trivedi was a teacher. He completed his primary education from Lunsar village near Wankaner. He studied pre-medical at the Faculty of Science, Dharamsinhji College, Rajkot from 1951 to 1953 and then an MBBS degree at the B. J. Medical College, Ahmedabad from 1953 to 1963.

Career 
He had higher training for two years in the Cleveland Clinic in the US, and practiced for eight years in Hamilton, Ontario, Canada. A visit to his native land changed his mind and he returned to Ahmedabad in 1977 to continue his practice in India. He joined B. J. Medical College as a professor of nephrology.

He founded the Institute of Kidney Diseases and Research Centre (IKDRC, also known as Kidney Hospital) located in the Ahmedabad Civil Hospital campus on 7 October 1981. The institute was moved to the new building in 1992. The Institute of Transplantation Sciences (ITS) was established in 1997 in the same campus. It is the largest kidney hospital in the world with 438 beds. He and his team completed more than 5200 kidney transplantations in the institute. It is also the only public-sector liver transplantation institute in India. IKDRC-ITS was upgraded into the Gujarat University of Transplantation Sciences in 2015 and Trivedi was appointed its Pro-Chancellor.

He founded the Indian Society of Organ Transplantation. He was also the founding chief editor of the Indian Journal of Transplantation and Indian Journal of Nephrology. He held several patents on stem-cell therapy for transplantation tolerance and insulin producing stem cells. His autobiography Tryst with Destiny (1996) is translated in Gujarati as Purusharth Potano: Prasad Prabhuno (2016) by Aruna Vanikar.

He died on 2 October 2019 in Ahmedabad after prolonged illness. He suffered from neurological and liver ailments, as well as Parkinson's disease.

Recognition 

Trivedi was a Fellow of the Royal College of Physicians of Canada (FRCP(C)). In 2006, the Institute of Transplantation Sciences was renamed Dr. H. L. Trivedi Institute of Transplantation Sciences in his honour. He was awarded an honorary Doctor of Science (D.Sc.) degree by King George's Medical University in 2009. He was felicitated as a Nagar Ratna by Ahmedabad Municipal Corporation in 2014.

He was honoured by the Government of India in 2015 with the Padma Shri, the fourth highest Indian civilian award. He was also awarded by The Transplantation Society in 2018.

Selected papers

References

1932 births
2019 deaths
20th-century Indian medical doctors
Scientists from Ahmedabad
Recipients of the Padma Shri in medicine
Indian medical academics
Indian medical researchers
Indian medical writers
Indian nephrologists
Medical doctors from Gujarat
Autobiographers
Neurological disease deaths in India
Deaths from Parkinson's disease
Indian immunologists